RAAF Area Explosives Reserve, Kowguran, also known as 3 Central Reserve (RAAF) or 3CR, was a World War II Royal Australian Air Force explosive ordnance depot built beside the Leichhardt Highway in central Queensland, Australia, near the town of Kowguran, about 20 km north of Miles.

Development
Approval was granted in September 1942 to construct the Reserve depot at Kowguran. The Queensland Main Roads Commission built the complex. 59 men were employed on this project.

A parade ground was also established.

The cost was estimated at £22,723 (2019 A$1,715,290).

Use
The Area Explosives Reserve was manned by 3 Central Reserve (RAAF) which was formed at Kowguran on 18 August 1943.

The site was decommissioned in 1956.

Post RAAF
In 1985, David and Julie Hinds purchased the 135 hectare property. It was renamed "Possum Park" and was made into a holiday destination, converting four of the bunkers into self-contained underground motel units. There are also train carriages converted to motel rooms, and powered caravan sites. As of 2020, the Hinds still own the property, and live in one of the converted, underground bunkers.

References

Royal Australian Air Force bases
Ammunition dumps
Military installations in Queensland
Military installations closed in the 1940s